The People's Republic of China competed at the 2017 Asian Indoor and Martial Arts Games in Ashgabat, Turkmenistan, from 17 to 27 September 2017.

Medalists

Indoor athletics

Men
Track events

Field events

Women
Track events

Field events

Bowling

Chess

Cue sports

Men

Women

Dancesport

Futsal

Kickboxing

Muay Thai

Men

Women

Short course swimming

Taekwondo

Weightlifting

Men

Women

Wrestling

References

2017 in Chinese sport
Nations at the 2017 Asian Indoor and Martial Arts Games